Brando is a surname of Germanic origin. Notable people with the surname include:

Marlon Brando (1924–2004), American actor
Christian Brando, Marlon's eldest son
Cheyenne Brando, Marlon's daughter
Miko Brando, Marlon's son
Jocelyn Brando, Marlon's older sister
Frédéric Brando, French footballer
Tim Brando, CBS Sports reporter and announcer
Marlon Brando (rapper) (1979–2001), American rapper
Dio Brando, fictional antagonist in Hirohiko Araki's manga JoJo's Bizarre Adventure